Henry Marsland (1798 – 26 November 1864) was a British Radical politician.

Marsland was elected Radical Member of Parliament for Stockport at the 1835 general election and held the seat until 1847 when he did not seek re-election.

References

External links
 

Members of the Parliament of the United Kingdom for Stockport
UK MPs 1835–1837
UK MPs 1837–1841
UK MPs 1841–1847
1798 births
1864 deaths